
Gmina Poświętne is a rural gmina (administrative district) in Białystok County, Podlaskie Voivodeship, in north-eastern Poland.

Villages
Gmina Poświętne contains the villages and settlements of Bielsk Podlaski, Brzozowo Stare, Brzozowo-Antonie, Brzozowo-Chabdy, Brzozowo-Chrzczonki, Brzozowo-Chrzczony, Brzozowo-Korabie, Brzozowo-Muzyły, Brzozowo-Panki, Brzozowo-Solniki, Chomizna, Dzierżki, Dzierżki-Ząbki, Gabrysin, Gołębie, Grochy, Józefin, Kamińskie Jaski, Kamińskie Ocioski, Kamińskie Pliszki, Kamińskie Wiktory, Kuran, Liza Nowa, Liza Stara, Łukawica, Marynki, Ostrów, Pietkowo, Pietkowo Drugie, Porośl-Głuchy, Porośl-Wojsławy, Stoczek, Turek, Wilkowo Nowe, Wilkowo Stare, Wołkuny, Zdrody Nowe and Zdrody Stare.

Neighbouring gminas
Gmina Poświętne is bordered by the gminy of Brańsk, Łapy, Nowe Piekuty, Sokoły, Suraż and Wyszki.

References
Polish official population figures 2006

Poswietne
Białystok County